Jonathan (Standard: Yəhōnatan/Yōnatan, Tiberian: Yо̆hōnāṯān/Yōnāṯān) is a common name given to males which means "YHWH has given" in Hebrew. The earliest known use of the name was in the Bible; one Jonathan was the son of King Saul, a close friend of David.

Variants of Jonathan include  Jonatan, Djonathan. Biblical variants include Yehonathan, Y'honathan, Yhonathan, Yonathan, Yehonatan, Yonatan, Yonaton, Yonoson, Yeonoson or Yehonasan. In Israel, "Yoni" is a common nickname for Yonatan (Jonathan) in the same way Jonny is in English. In Latin America both "Jhonny" and "Johnny" coexist due to misspelling and have become commonly used (Jhonny Peralta, Jhonny Rivera, Jhonny da Silva).

The name was the 31st-most-popular boys' name in the United States in 2011, according to the SSA.

List of alternatives 
 , جوناثان
 
 Aramaic:
 
 
 Targumic 
 
 
 
 
 
 
 
 
 
 
 
 
 
 
 
 
 
  ヨナタン Yonatan
 
 
 
 
Persian: جاناتان
 
 
 
 
 
 
Spanish: Jonatán, translit. Yónathan
 
 
Tigrinya: ዮናታን

See also
 For the Israeli moshav, see Yonatan, Golan Heights
 Johnathan, a given name
 Jonathan (disambiguation)
 John (given name)
 Nathaniel, for a name with a similar root and meaning

References

Danish masculine given names
Dutch masculine given names
English masculine given names
French masculine given names
German masculine given names
Hebrew masculine given names
Irish masculine given names
Jewish given names
Scottish masculine given names
Welsh masculine given names
Modern names of Hebrew origin
Theophoric names